Saccoloma laxum is a species of fern in the family Lindsaeaceae. It is endemic to Ecuador, where it is only known from a single location in Zamora-Chinchipe Province. It grows in Amazonian forest habitat on limestone, a rock type which is rare in the region. It is threatened by urbanization and deforestation.

References

Polypodiales
Ferns of Ecuador
Endemic flora of Ecuador
Ferns of the Americas
Zamora-Chinchipe Province
Endangered flora of South America
Taxonomy articles created by Polbot
Plants described in 1995